Joseph Brewer Jobberns  was Dean of Brechin from 1931 until 1936.

He was educated at the University of Aberdeen and ordained in 1895. After a curacy in Dundee he was Rector of Holy Rood Church, Carnoustie from 1896–1922. From 1923 he was the incumbent at St Mary Magdalene, Dundee.

Notes

Alumni of the University of Aberdeen
Scottish Episcopalian clergy
Deans of Brechin
People associated with Dundee
Year of birth missing
Year of death missing